Acacia meiosperma is a shrub or tree belonging to the genus Acacia and the subgenus Juliflorae that is native to north eastern Australia.

Description
Like most species of Acacia it has phyllodes rather than true leaves.

Distribution

See also
List of Acacia species

References

meiosperma
Flora of Queensland
Taxa named by Leslie Pedley
Plants described in 1990